Franck Ferrand (born 12 October 1967 in Poitiers) is a French writer and radio personality who specializes in history. He has a radio show about major figures of French history on Radio Classique, a French Radio station.

Publications

Non-fiction
Ils ont sauvé Versailles, Librairie Académique Perrin, 20 février 2003, 367 p., 
La grande époque des sports d’hiver, Le Chêne, 3 novembre 2003, 175 p., 
Jacques Garcia ou l'éloge du décor, Flammarion, 22 juin 2005, 263 p., 
Gérald Van der Kemp : Un gentilhomme à Versailles, Librairie Académique Perrin, 27 octobre 2005, 248 p., 
L'Histoire interdite, révélations sur l’histoire de France, Tallandier, 16 octobre 2008, 203 p., 
L'ombre des Romanov, XO Éditions, 10 novembre 2010, 368 p., 
Au cœur de l'histoire, Flammarion, 26 octobre 2011, 349 p., 
Versailles après les rois, Librairie Académique Perrin, coll. « Tempus », 3 mai 2012, 408 p., 
Du sang sur l'histoire, Flammarion, 10 octobre 2012, 352 p., 
Dictionnaire amoureux de Versailles, Plon, 17 octobre 2013, 557 p., 
François Ier, roi de chimères, Flammarion, 24 septembre 2014, 300 p., 
L'Histoire au jour le jour, Flammarion, 2015,

Novels

References 

1967 births
Living people
20th-century French non-fiction writers
21st-century French non-fiction writers
French radio presenters
People from Poitiers
Sciences Po alumni
French gay writers